Morón is a Venezuelan town located on the coast of Carabobo State. It is the capital of the Juan José Mora Municipality.

Several important industries are located close by, like El Palito refinery (one of the largest in Venezuela) and the most important electricity centre of Venezuela, Planta Centro.  The  motorways 1 and 3 join in here and communicate the West with the centre.

Places of interest 

 The Casa de la Cultura or Culture House in the historical centre of Morón
 The Santa Ana church
 Monument to the Mosquito (also in the city centre)

History 
Morón appears in the parish registers in the eighteenth century as Santa Ana de Morón. 
The area was a place where many black slaves who had run away.  The slave Andresote took refuge in the mountains of the region and he organized revolts from there.

Morón and other towns of the area were burnt down during the Federal War in 1859.

Namesakes 
There are a number of other towns in Venezuela with this name.

References

External links 

 Site about the town (in Spanish)

Populated places in Carabobo
Populated coastal places in Venezuela